Herbert or Herb Henderson may refer to:

Herbert Stephen Henderson (1870–1942), Victoria Cross holder
Herb Henderson (Australian footballer) (born 1930), Australian rules player
Herb Henderson (American football) (1899–1991), American football player
Herb H. Henderson, American attorney and civil rights activist

See also
Bert Henderson (disambiguation)